Ida Louisa Lee, (11 February 1865 — 3 October 1943), historian and poet, was born at Kelso, New South Wales. She was elected a Fellow of the Royal Geographical Society (FRGS) in 1914 and an Honorary Fellow of the Royal Australian Historical Society (Hon. FRAHS). Lee wrote a number of historical texts, some of which contain previously unpublished material.

Lee was the third child of grazier and politician, George Lee, and Louisa (née Kite). On a visit to England, Lee married Charles John Bruce Marriott (1861–1936) on 14 October 1891 at the parish church, Felixstowe, Suffolk.

Bibliography

Non-fiction
 The Coming of the British to Australia, 1788-1829 (1906)
 Commodore Sir John Hayes (1912)
 [https://catalog.hathitrust.org/Record/006576842 The Logbooks of the 'Lady Nelson'''] (1915)
 Captain Bligh's Second Voyage to the South Sea (1920)
 Early Explorers in Australia (1925)
 The Voyage of the 'Caroline' from England to Van Dieman's Land and Batavia (1927)

Poetry
 Songs and Verse (189?)
 The Bush Fire and Other Verses (1897)

References

 Further reading 

Adelaide, Debra (1988) Australian women writers: a bibliographic guide'', London, Pandora

External links
 
 Works by Ida Lee at Project Gutenberg of Australia
 
 ebook by Ida Lee Early Explorers in Australia at The Allan Cunningham Project

Australian historians
Australian women historians
Australian poets
1865 births
1943 deaths
Australian women poets
19th-century Australian women
20th-century Australian women